José Luis Pacheco Gómez (14 January 1947 – 27 September 2022) was a Spanish footballer who played as a goalkeeper.

Career
Pacheco played for Atlético Madrid between 1967 and 1979, being a member of the squads which won the Spanish League in 1972–73 and 1976–77, the Intercontinental Cup in 1974, and the Copa del Rey in 1972 and 1976. During his time with the club, he was used mainly as a back-up behind first Rodri then Miguel Reina.

Post-playing career
After his retirement from playing, Pacheco worked as a radio presenter at Radio Rioja Cadena SER.

Death
Pacheco died in Santander on 28 September 2022, at the age of 75.

References

1947 births
2022 deaths
Spanish footballers
Footballers from Santander, Spain
Footballers from Cantabria
Association football goalkeepers
La Liga players
Segunda División B players
Segunda División players
Atlético Madrid footballers
Racing de Santander players
Rayo Cantabria players
CD Logroñés footballers